The Roman Catholic Archdiocese of Keewatin–Le Pas is a Roman Catholic archdiocese that includes parts of the Provinces of Manitoba, Saskatchewan, and Ontario and has the suffragan diocese of Churchill-Baie d'Hudson. The current archbishop is Murray Chatlain.

Prior to 2018, it included as suffragan dioceses the Diocese of Labrador City-Schefferville dissolved in 2007 and the Diocese of Moosonee dissolved in 2018.

As of 2006, the archdiocese contains 49 parishes, 3 active diocesan priests, 15 religious priests, and 42,000 Catholics. It has 3 religious nuns.

The seat of the diocese is at Our Lady of the Sacred Heart Cathedral in The Pas.

History
This largely barren land of lakes and forests, possessing timber and mineral resources but sparsely inhabited by Indians, Métis and a few Europeans, was first visited by pioneer missionaries in the nineteenth century, when Mgr. Norbert Provencher, Bishop of St. Boniface, sent Abbé Thibault to Île-à-la-Crosse (1845), Abbé Louis-Francois Richer Lafleche (later Bishop of Three Rivers) to explore the Cumberland district (1846) and Father Taché, O.M.I. (later Archbishop of St. Boniface), to join Lafleche at Ile-à-la-Crosse (1846), and thence visit Reindeer Lake (1847). These and surrounding missions were subsequently served by Oblates of the Manitoba or Alberta-Saskatchewan Provinces.

The Apostolic Vicariate of Keewatin was a Roman Catholic missionary pre-diocesan jurisdiction in northern Canada which included the northern half of the Province of Saskatchewan, and was bounded on the north by the Arctic regions, on the south by the Roman Catholic Archdiocese of Saint-Boniface, on the east by the then Apostolic Vicariate of Temiskaming, and on the west by the Diocese of St Albert and the then Apostolic Vicariate of Athabasca.

Prominent among these since 1887 has been the Rev. Ovide Charlebois whose administrative capacities, proved during sixteen years' ministry at Fort Cumberland, led in 1900 to his nomination as Visitor of the Cumberland District Indian Missions, in 1903, to his appointment as director of Saint Michael's Indian Industrial School at Duck Lake (Saskatchewan), and in 1910 to his preconization as titular Bishop of Berenice and Vicar Apostolic of Keewatin, with residence at The Pas.

There were in the vicariate in the early 20th century 15 Oblate Fathers of Mary Immaculate, 8 Oblate Brothers of Mary Immaculate, 12 Grey Nuns (Montreal), 16 Oblate Sisters of the Sacred Heart and Mary Immaculate (St. Boniface), 4 more Grey Nuns (St. Hyacinth), 10 churches with 16 out-stations; 11,000 Indians, Dene, Cree and Inuit, of whom 7000 were Catholics and 5000 non-Catholics or pagans (chiefly Inuit religion). Indian boarding schools at Norway House (Oblate Sisters, 20 pupils), Beauval Residential School at Lac La Plonge [Grey Nuns (Montreal), 50 pupils], a general hospital at Le Pas [Grey Nuns (St. Hyacinth), 25 beds], a Catholic (French-English) school at Le Pas [Grey Nuns (St. Hyacinth)].

It was renamed and promoted Metropolitan See of Keewatin-Le Pas in 1967; its archbishop now has an ecclesiastical province with two suffragan bishops in Churchill-Baie d'Hudson and Moosonee; the third, Labrador City-Schefferville, was suppressed in 2007.

Bishops

Diocesan bishops
The following is a list of the bishops and archbishops of Keewatin-Le Pas and their terms of service:
 Ovide Charlebois, O.M.I. (1910–1933)
 Martin Giuseppe Onorio LeJeunesse, O.M.I. (1933–1954)
 Paul Dumouchel, O.M.I. (1955–1986)
 Peter Alfred Sutton, O.M.I. (1986–2006)
 Sylvain Lavoie, O.M.I. (2006–2012)
 Murray Chatlain (2012–present)

Coadjutor bishops
 Martin Joseph-Honoré Lajeunesse, O.M.I. (1933), as Coadjutor Vicar Apostolic
 Peter Alfred Sutton, O.M.I. (1986)
 Sylvain Lavoie , O.M.I. (2005–2006)

See also
List of Indian residential schools in Canada

References
Archdiocese of Keewatin–Le Pas page at catholichierarchy.org  retrieved June 11, 2013

External links 

 
Culture of Manitoba
History of Manitoba by location